Fortitudo means courage or fortitude. It may also refer to:
 Fortitudo (planet), also known Xi Aquilae b
 Fortitudo-Pro Roma S.G.S., a sports society in Rome, formerly named "Fortitudo"
 Cosenza Calcio 1914, soccer team in Cosenza formerly named "Fortitudo"
 Cosenza Calcio, soccer team in Cosenza formerly named "Fortitudo"
 Fortitudo Bologna, sports teams from Bologna named Fortitudo
 , an Italian tugboat

See also
Fortitude (disambiguation)